Eryn Bulmer Barrett (born August 1, 1976) is a female diver from Canada, who won the gold medal in the Women's 3m Springboard at the 1999 Pan American Games. Born in Edmonton, Alberta, Barrett represented her native country at two Summer Olympics: 1996 and 2000.

References

External links
 Canadian Olympic Committee

1976 births
Living people
Commonwealth Games bronze medallists for Canada
Commonwealth Games gold medallists for Canada
Canadian female divers
Divers at the 1996 Summer Olympics
Divers at the 1998 Commonwealth Games
Divers at the 2000 Summer Olympics
Olympic divers of Canada
Divers from Edmonton
Pan American Games gold medalists for Canada
Commonwealth Games medallists in diving
Pan American Games medalists in diving
Divers at the 1999 Pan American Games
Medalists at the 1999 Pan American Games
21st-century Canadian women
20th-century Canadian women
Medallists at the 1998 Commonwealth Games